The following is a partial alphabetical list of lakes and reservoirs in the U.S. State of Colorado.

Most of the larger lakes in Colorado are either reservoirs or dam-enhanced natural lakes.

A
Acascosa Lake in Conejos County, Colorado
Antero Reservoir in Park County, Colorado
Aurora Reservoir in Aurora, Colorado

B
Barbour Ponds in Saint Vrain State Park
Barker Meadow Reservoir in Boulder County, Colorado
Barr Lake in Barr Lake State Park
Bear Creek Lake in Lakewood, Colorado
Bierstadt Lake in Larimer County, Colorado
Bison Reservoir in Victor, Colorado
Blue Mesa Reservoir in Curecanti National Recreation Area – largest reservoir in Colorado
Bonham Reservoir in Mesa County, Colorado
Boulder Reservoir in Boulder, Colorado
Boyd Lake in Boyd Lake State Park

C
Carter Lake in Larimer County, Colorado
Chambers Lake in Larimer County, Colorado
Chatfield Reservoir in Chatfield State Park
City Park Lake in Denver
Cherry Creek Reservoir in Cherry Creek State Park
Clear Creek Reservoir in Chaffee County, Colorado
Crater Lake in Pitkin County, Colorado
Cheesman Reservoir in Douglas and Jefferson counties, Colorado
Crawford Reservoir in Crawford State Park
Crystal Creek Reservoir in Teller County, Colorado
Crystal Reservoir in Curecanti National Recreation Area

D
Dawson Reservoir in Mesa County, Colorado
Deep Lake in Garfield County, Colorado
Deep Ward Lake in Mesa County
Delaney Butte Reservoir in Jackson County, Colorado
DeWeese Reservoir in Custer County, Colorado
Dillon Reservoir in Dillon Reservoir Recreation Area
Dream Lake in Rocky Mountain National Park

E
East Portal Reservoir in Larimer County, Colorado
Echo Lake (Colorado) in Echo Lake Park
Eleven Mile Reservoir in Eleven Mile State Park
Elkhead Reservoir in Elkhead State Park
Emmaline lake in Pingree Park
Emerald Lake (San Juan National Forest) in Weminuche Wilderness
Lake Estes in Estes Park, Colorado

F
Fern Lake in Rocky Mountain National Park
Flatiron Reservoir in Larimer County, Colorado
Fruitgrowers Reservoir in Delta County, Colorado

G
Grand Lake near Rocky Mountain National Park – largest natural lake in Colorado
Grass Valley Reservoir in Harvey Gap State Park in Garfield County
Green Mountain Reservoir in Green Mountain Reservoir Recreation Area
Gross Reservoir in Boulder County, Colorado

H
Hanging Lake in Glenwood Canyon
Harker Park Lake in Rio Blanco County, Colorado
Harvey Gap Reservoir in Harvey Gap State Park
Haynach Lakes in Rocky Mountain National Park
Horsetooth Reservoir in Larimer County, Colorado

J
Jackson Gulch Reservoir in Montezuma County, Colorado
Jefferson Lake in Park County, Colorado
Jackson Lake in Jackson Lake State Park, Morgan County, Colorado
John Martin Reservoir in John Martin Reservoir State Park – largest reservoir in eastern Colorado

K
Kenney Reservoir, in Rio Blanco County, Colorado

L
La Jara Reservoir in Conejos County, Colorado
Lake Avery in Rio Blanco County, Colorado
Lake Dillon, see Dillon Reservoir
Lake Estes in Estes Park, Colorado
Lake George in Park County, Colorado
Lake Granby in Arapaho National Recreation Area
Lake Isabel in Lake Isabel Recreation Area
Lake John in Jackson County, Colorado
 Lake Loveland in Loveland, Colorado
Lake Meredith in Crowley County, Colorado
Lake Pueblo in Lake Pueblo State Park
Lake Maloya in Colfax County, New Mexico and Las Animas County, Colorado
Lake Rhoda in Lakeside, Colorado
Lake San Cristobal in Hinsdale County, Colorado – second largest natural lake in Colorado
Lemon Reservoir in La Plata County, Colorado
Lizard Lake in Gunnison County, Colorado

M
Maroon Lake in Pitkin County, Colorado
Marston Lake in Denver
Marys Lake in Larimer County, Colorado
McPhee Reservoir in McPhee Recreation Area – second largest reservoir in Colorado
Meadow Creek Reservoir in Arapaho National Recreation Area
Miramonte Reservoir in San Miguel County, Colorado
Monarch Lake in Arapaho National Recreation Area
Montgomery Reservoir in Park County, Colorado
Morrow Point Reservoir in Curecanti National Recreation Area
Mount Elbert Forebay in Lake County, Colorado
Mountain Home Reservoir in Costilla County, Colorado
Murphy Lake in Rocky Mountain National Park

N
Navajo Reservoir at Navajo State Park
North Michigan Creek Reservoir in State Forest State Park

O
 O'Haver Lake at San Isabel National Forest

P
Pacific Tarn in Summit County, Colorado – highest named lake in the United States
Paonia Reservoir in Paonia State Park
Pearl Lake in Pearl Lake State Park
Pinewood Lake in Larimer County, Colorado
Platoro Reservoir in Conejos County, Colorado
Poudre Lake in Rocky Mountain National Park
Pueblo Reservoir, see Lake Pueblo

Q
Quincy Reservoir in Aurora, Colorado

R
Ralph White Lake in Moffat County, Colorado
Ralston Reservoir in Jefferson County, Colorado
Rampart Reservoir in El Paso County, Colorado
Ridgway Reservoir in Ridgway State Park
Rifle Gap Reservoir in Rifle Gap State Park
Ruedi Reservoir in the John Ruedi Recreation Area of White River National Forest
Rueter–Hess Reservoir in Douglas County, Colorado
Runyon Lake in Pueblo, Colorado

S
San Luis Lake in San Luis State Park, Alamosa County, Colorado
Sanchez Reservoir in Costilla County, Colorado
Seaman Reservoir near Fort Collins
Shadow Mountain Lake in Arapaho National Recreation Area, Grand County, Colorado
Silver Jack Reservoir in Gunnison County, Colorado
Sloan's Lake in Denver, Colorado
Smith Lake in Washington Park, Denver, Colorado
Smith Reservoir in Costilla County, Colorado
Snowdrift Lake in Rocky Mountain National Park, Grand County, Colorado
Stagecoach Reservoir in Stagecoach State Park, Routt County, Colorado
Standley Lake in Westminster, Colorado
Steamboat Lake in Steamboat Lake State Park, Routt County, Colorado
Strontia Springs Reservoir in Douglas County and Jefferson County, Colorado
Sweitzer Lake in Sweitzer Lake State Park, Delta County, Colorado
Summit Lake in Summit Lake Park, Clear Creek County, Colorado
Sylvan Lake in Sylvan Lake State Park, Eagle County, Colorado

T
Taylor Park Reservoir in Gunnison County, Colorado
Terrace Reservoir in Conejos County, Colorado
Trappers Lake in the Flat Tops Wilderness Area of White River National Forest
Trinidad Lake in Trinidad Lake State Park
Turquoise Lake in the Turquoise Lake Recreation Area of San Isabel National Forest
Twin Lakes in Twin Lakes Recreation Area of San Isabel National Forest

V
Vallecito Reservoir in La Plata County, Colorado
Vega Reservoir in Vega State Park

W
Williams Creek Reservoir in San Juan National Forest, Hinsdale County, Colorado
Williams Fork Reservoir in Grand County, Colorado
Willow Creek Reservoir in Arapaho National Recreation Area, Grand County, Colorado
Windy Gap Reservoir in Grand County, Colorado
Wolford Mountain Reservoir, Grand County, Colorado

See also

List of dams and reservoirs in Colorado
List of federal lands in Colorado
List of Colorado state parks
:Category:Lakes of Colorado
:Category:Reservoirs in Colorado

External links
Wildernet.com

Colorado
Lakes